A musical instrument of the chordophone family, the lyre-guitar was a type of guitar shaped to look like a lyre, popular as a fad-instrument in the late 1800s. It had six single courses, with a fretboard located between two curved arms recalling the shape of the ancient Greek kithara. It was tuned and played like the conventional guitar.

The lyre-guitar nearly always had a built-in pedestal allowing it to stand upright when not in use.

History

Pierre Charles Mareschal claimed to have invented it in 1780, what he called the Lira Anacreòntica. Mareschal was a prominent French luthier, and accused the French musician Phillis Pleyel of stealing his design.

The lyre-guitar enjoyed great popularity as a salon instrument, especially in Paris between 1780 and 1820. It became very much in vogue and pervaded the highest levels of society; Marie Antoinette played one and the great guitarists of the day such as Ferdinando Carulli, Fernando Sor, Matteo Carcassi, Mauro Giuliani, and Pierre Jean Porro wrote music and method books for it.

Its decline coincided with the waning of the popularity of the guitar as a salon instrument, increasingly supplanted by the piano which benefited from ongoing improvements to its keyboard action.

The lyre-guitar persisted, but not so much as a musical instrument, instead it persisted as a common symbol of classicist ideals, and appeared in numerous allegorical paintings (e.g. Mähler's portrait of Beethoven). Later on it was used in photographs as a prop for evoking ancient Greek and Roman themes.
The idea was to create an instrument which looked pretty and provided a visual accessory to help ladies of fashion to assume the gracious pose of Greek kithara players. This visual likeness became a potent ingredient of the culture of the upper classes.

Although the lyre-guitar is rarely heard or recorded it is not extinct. A body of nearly forgotten repertoire exists often by highly notable guitarists of the golden age of the guitar. Today lyre-guitars can be made to order by luthiers and authentic examples exist in museums and private collections.

Lyre-guitar luthiers
 Robert Wornum (1780–1852)
 César Pons (1748–1831) 
 Francois Roudhloff (Mauchand, France)

Notes

References

Bibliography

External links

Historical sources 
 Einige Worte über die neue französische Lyra (Lyre-Guitarre.) AMZ, August 1801 (includes an image on page 789)
 General music teacher: adapted to self-instruction...embracing also an extensive dictionary of musical terms by Gottfried Weber; Publisher: J.H. Wilkins, & R.B. Carter, 1842
 Adams' new musical dictionary by John Stowell Adams; Publisher: S.T. Gordon & Son, 1865

Sheet music
Carcassi, Matteo "Fantaisie pour la guitare ou lyre"

Websites
https://web.archive.org/web/20100504121502/http://www.eleonoravulpiani.com/history.htm
http://www.harpguitars.net/history/org/org-lyres.htm#lg

Recordings
MP3 samples of the lyre-guitar

Museums
Cité de la musique, Paris (search-phrase: Mot-clé(s) : lyre guitare)
Museum of Fine Arts, Boston
National Music Museum, The University of South Dakota
The Metropolitan Museum of Art, New York, New York
Museum für Musikinstrumente der Universität Leipzig (click on Lyragitarren)
Ringve Museum, Trondheim (in Norwegian)
Museo Civico d'Arte di Modena (shows a lyre guitar by Gennaro Fabricatore)

Guitars